The Willow Tree is a novel written by Hubert Selby, Jr. and was published in 1998. It was Selby's first novel in twenty years, since 1978's Requiem for a Dream.

Plot summary
The protagonist is a thirteen-year-old African American boy named Bobby who lives in an apartment in South Bronx with his mother and siblings. Despite his young age Bobby has intelligence that is superior to most of the people around him. Bobby's Hispanic girlfriend Maria often spend time together and have plans for the upcoming summer. Bobby and Maria's lives are shattered when a vicious Hispanic street gang attack Bobby and Maria while the two were walking to school. Bobby and Maria are severely beaten and Maria is sent to the hospital suffering from near-fatal wounds. After Bobby is beaten he gets picked up by an old Holocaust survivor named Moishe and an unlikely friendship between Bobby and Moishe begins. Maria, unable to cope with the mutilation of her face caused by the lye, commits suicide. We hear Moishe talking about his tragic story while he was in a concentration camp, while Bobby tells Moishe what has happened to him and Maria. Bobby states that deep in his mind, he still has a desperate need for revenge.

Release details
 Paperback - , published in 1998 by Marion Boyars Publishers

References

1998 American novels
Novels set in New York City
English-language novels